The Last of the Secret Agents? is a 1966 American comedy film that spoofs the spy film genre, starring the then-popular comedy team of Allen & Rossi.

Plot
Two Americans in Paris (Allen & Rossi) are reluctantly recruited by the Good Guys Institute (GGI) led by J. Frederick Duval (John Williams) to thwart the plans of the evil crime and espionage organisation THEM led by Zoltan Schubach (Theo Marcuse). Already with a cache of stolen priceless international art treasures, THEM plots to steal the Venus de Milo with the intention of reattaching its two arms of which they are in possession.

In addition to the then popular spy film genre, the film spoofs many other items of the day such as cigarette commercials. That one involves Marty tiring of Schubach's threat on closed-circuit television and changing the channel to one featuring a cowboy representing the Marlboro Man turning to the camera with a black right eye and saying "I'd rather switch than fight." The movie ends with an early-evening heist involving the Statue of Liberty's removal from its pedestal by helicopter and cable. The segue to that final scene is stock footage of the Manhattan skyline from the northeast blackout of 1965.

Cast
 Marty Allen as  Marty Johnson
 Steve Rossi as Steve Donovan
 John Williams as J. Frederick Duval
 Nancy Sinatra as Micheline 
 Lou Jacobi as Papa Leo
 Theo Marcuse as Zoltan Schubach
 Carmen Dell'Orefice as Baby May Zoftig
 Remo Pisani as Them I 
 Ben Lessy as Harry
 Loren Ewing as GGI Man
 Sig Ruman as Prof. Werner von Koeing
 Larry Duran as Them II
 Wilhelm von Homburg as GGI Man
 Aida Fries as Belly dancer
 Harvey Korman as German Colonel
 Edy Williams as Edy
 Thordis Brandt as Fred Johnson
 Ed Sullivan as himself

Music
Nancy Sinatra had made several film appearances previously, and it was planned that she would sing a song written for her by Paramount's Famous Music division's Burt Bacharach and Hal David, but it was cut due to budget constraints. During post-production in January 1966, Sinatra's "These Boots Are Made for Walkin'" composed by Lee Hazlewood was a smash hit.

Paramount ordered the producer to have Sinatra sing in the film with Hazlewood quickly composing a title song for her reminiscent of John Barry's "Thunderball". The resulting song, "The Last of the Secret Agents", did not appear on the Pete King soundtrack album. 
Neal Hefti wrote the song "You Are" for Steve Rossi, which does appear on the soundtrack, as does the song "Don Jose, Ole" written by Tolkin and Abbott. Sinatra's title song was reused as an end title song in Bill Murray's The Man Who Knew Too Little.

Even though this film lampoons the James Bond franchise, Sinatra would the following year ironically record two versions of Barry's song "You Only Live Twice" for the 1967 Bond film of the same name.

Production
Allen & Rossi were a popular comedy team in their nightclub and television appearances, notably on The Ed Sullivan Show. Paramount Pictures had highly successful comedy teams of Bob Hope and Bing Crosby in the 1940s and Dean Martin and Jerry Lewis in the 1950s and no doubt wished to recreate their success with the duo's screen debut in the film. (This proved not to be the case, and no sequels were produced for the film, although the duo did appear in the 1974 film Allen and Rossi Meet Dracula and Frankenstein.)

Mel Tolkin had written for Your Show of Shows and had many other comedy credits, whilst Norman Abbott, the nephew of Bud Abbott, had the experience of directing many successful American television comedy shows. Steve Rossi wanted to incorporate material from their comedy routine into the film but his ideas were refused.

See also
 List of James Bond parodies and spin-offs

References

External links
 
 Stills from The Last of the Secret Agents? at Marty Allen web site http://www.martyallen.net/
 

1966 films
1960s spy comedy films
Paramount Pictures films
American parody films
1960s parody films
American spy comedy films
1966 comedy films
Parody films based on James Bond films
1960s English-language films
1960s American films